The Fremantle Marlins Water Polo Club is an Australian club water polo team that competes in the National Water Polo League.  They are a women's team and are based in Fremantle.

References

External links

Water polo clubs in Australia
Fremantle
Sporting clubs in Perth, Western Australia
Women's sports teams in Australia
Women's water polo